John David Benbow Robertson (22 February 1917 – 12 October 1996) was an English cricketer, who played county cricket for Middlesex, and in 11 Test matches for England.

A right-handed opening batsman of consistency and class, Jack Robertson was a heavy scorer in county cricket who averaged 46 runs per innings in Tests. Yet he played only eleven times for England, was dropped after making a century in 1949, and was never selected to face Australia.

Born in Chiswick, London, England, it was Robertson's misfortune to be overshadowed by others, both in his international and county cricket career. He came to prominence in wartime cricket for the Army when he scored 102 in July 1942 against the Royal Navy. For the first half dozen years of cricket after World War II, England's preferred opening partnership was the trans-Pennine combination of Leonard Hutton and Cyril Washbrook; Robertson's selection for the first Test of 1949 against New Zealand was the result of injury to Washbrook and, despite scoring 121 and sharing a partnership of 143 with Hutton, he lost his place.

For Middlesex, Robertson often seemed similarly overshadowed by the batting of Denis Compton and Bill Edrich. Yet in the summer of 1947, when Compton's 3,816 runs and Edrich's 3,539 set new records for run-getting, Robertson was not far behind, making 2,760 runs with 12 centuries. He surpassed that in 1951 with 2,917 runs, the highest aggregate of any batsman that season. He could also bat as entertainingly as his better-known county colleagues. In 1949, he made an undefeated 331 in a day against Worcestershire at New Road, Worcester, an innings that remains the highest scored in first-class cricket by a Middlesex batsman, and the highest first-class innings by any batsman at New Road.

Robertson passed 1,000 runs in a season every year from 1946 until 1958 but, failing to find any form in 1959, he retired and became county coach.

He was one of the five Wisden Cricketers of the Year in 1948.

He died in October 1996, in Bury St Edmunds after years of ill-health, at the age of 79, and leaving a widow, Joyce, and a son.

References

External links 

 

1917 births
1996 deaths
English cricket coaches
Middlesex cricket coaches
England Test cricketers
Middlesex cricketers
Wisden Cricketers of the Year
English cricketers
Players cricketers
Marylebone Cricket Club cricketers
North v South cricketers
L. E. G. Ames' XI cricketers
British Army personnel of World War II